Springeratus is a genus of clinids found in the southwestern Pacific and western Indian Ocean. The generic name honours the American taxonomist and ichthyologist Victor G. Springer.

Species
There are currently three recognized species in this genus:
 Springeratus caledonicus (Sauvage, 1874) (Caledonian weedfish)
 Springeratus polyporatus T. H. Fraser, 1972
 Springeratus xanthosoma (Bleeker, 1857)

References

 
Clinidae